Chinese expansionism over the last four thousand years has been a central feature of the history of East Asia. During times when China wielded much greater power such as during the Han, Tang, Yuan, and Qing dynasties, China would even influence the development and politics further north and west in North Asia, Central Asia, and parts of South and Southeast Asia.

Historic background

Qin and Han dynasties 
Historically, China has been a major empire in history, and throughout its history, China developed from the northern basin of the Huaxia, which is believed to be between modern Yellow and Yangtze rivers, slowly became a major power from ancient era. To achieve that, various ancient Chinese dynasties had perpetuated the expansion of the realm, until it was unified under the Qin dynasty. However, it was only the Qin dynasty that China truly started its process of expansion into other nations. Qin dynasty's expansionism eventually led to its first contacts with the ancient Yue tribes, and further extended to the Korean Peninsula, as well as the Xiongnus. The Qin dynasty laid the foundation for future territorial expansions by subsequent Chinese dynasties.

The Han dynasty marked the height of early Chinese expansionism. Under the Han dynasty, China managed to conquer northern Korea and northern Vietnam, annexing several parts of these territories in the process. The Han dynasty also managed to conquer nomad tribes as far north as Mongolia and Siberia and gained control over western regions as far as modern Xinjiang and parts of Central Asia.

Following the fall of the Han dynasty, the Korea peninsula gained political independence from The Central Plain dynasties, leaving only northern Vietnam remaining under Chinese control, and the Three Kingdoms era temporarily halted Chinese expansionism. Nonetheless, the Cao Wei, Shu Han and Eastern Wu managed to extend its territorial gains in some parts under their territorial control. Once the Three Kingdoms ended and establishment of the Jin dynasty, Chinese expansionism stopped becoming the main headline for four centuries, as China was in dire need to consolidate back its borderland following its significant population losses.

The Sui dynasty, which reunified China after another 350 years of divisions, attempted to embark back on expansionism, but four disastrous campaigns to Goguryeo put the dynasty to its end.

Tang dynasty 
The establishment of the Tang dynasty marked the comeback of Chinese expansionism. Like the Han, the Tang was an ancient superpower and another golden age. Under the Tang dynasty, China managed to maintain control over northern Vietnam and Korea. The Chinese Empire also managed to extend its control over Xinjiang and Central Asia, reaching as far west as the Aral Sea and Caspian Sea. China also gained loyalty from the Turkic and Sogdian tribes at the northern and western borders. The Tang managed to encroach into the Tibetan territory and occupy Lhasa, until they had to abandon due to difficult climate.

The Tang Chinese expansion was checked following the Battle of Talas in modern-day Kyrgyzstan, when the Tang was defeated by the Arabs. However, China remained strong enough to process a significant weight until the An Lushan Rebellion which crippled the Tang. The rebellion partly led to the collapse and implosion of the Tang into several warring states and kingdoms. After the Tang collapse, China would be divided into several smaller nations until the unification during the Yuan dynasty and Mongol empire.

Fragmentation during Song, Jin, Liao dynasties 
When the Tang dynasty collapsed, China entered the Five Dynasties and Ten Kingdoms period. After this period, China remained fragmented and was divided into a number of smaller countries that emerged from the turmoil. These included the Song dynasty to the south and the Liao and Jin dynasties to the north. The Song, Liao, and Jin would continue to fight each other for centuries. As a result of perpetual instability, the Vietnamese eventually seceded from the union in the Battle of Bạch Đằng in 938, Song dynasty, unified much of China's south and launched an invasion of northern Vietnam in the process, but was repelled by Lê Hoàn. From then, the Song dynasty had struggled to reconsolidate back the borderland and inner territories, as well as repeated wars with Vietnam, the Liao dynasty, the Jin dynasty and the Western Xia. This had prevented the Song dynasty from ever taking any serious military expeditions. These various kingdoms (Song, Liao, Jin, Xia) would fight each other until they were all conquered and unified by the Yuan dynasty in 1279.

Yuan dynasty 
The Yuan dynasty was founded by the Mongols in the traditional Chinese style in 1271. The Yuan dynasty and Mongol empire was characterized by unprecedented territorial expansionism north and west, reaching as far as Europe and West Asia. Yuan China undertook attempts to conquer other territories further east and south too. The Yuan dynasty launched two invasions of Burma, with the first invasion delivering a devastating blow to the Pagan Kingdom and effectively resulted in its collapse. The Yuan dynasty also managed to conquer Korea and Tibet, thereby incorporating Tibet into Chinese territory for the first time in history. However, the Yuan dynasty had been unsuccessful in its attempt to conquer Vietnam, with the Mongols being repelled by Trần Thái Tông. Furthermore, The Yuan's naval expeditions to invade Java and Japan had disastrous results, eventually leading to the end of Sino-Mongol expansionist desires.

Decline during Ming dynasty 
Following the collapse of the Yuan dynasty, the newly established Ming dynasty was initially reluctant to embark on expansionism due to destruction from rebellions in the waning years of the Yuan dynasty. The first Ming emperor, Hongwu, was openly against expansionism and was more concerned with killing his internal political opponents than dealing with outside threats. He specifically warned future Emperors only to defend against foreign barbarians, and not engage in military campaigns for glory and conquest. However, once Hongwu died, the reign of Yongle saw the Ming attempt to expand its territories. The Ming launched an invasion to Vietnam, eventually leading to the fourth Chinese domination. However, the Ming was defeated in the Battle of Tốt Động – Chúc Động 20 years later. Moreover, the Ming launched an attack on the Mongols and Northern Yuan to the north, but the Ming failed, and their emperors were even captured by the Mongols in the Tumu Crisis. Following its failures in Vietnam and the north, the Ming dynasty started to concentrate only in internal affairs, and refused to make further interventions or expeditions, except for naval expeditions and trades such as the Ming treasure voyages by Zheng He. Rather than expanding, the Ming was more defensive in nature and faced internal rebellions such as the Rebellion of Cao Qin and Bozhou rebellion as well as invasions from the north such as from the Later Jin (eventually the Qing) and the Japanese under Toyotomi Hideyoshi in the Imjin war.

Qing dynasty 

The Qing dynasty was a Manchu-ruled dynasty, descended from the Jurchens which founded the Jin dynasty earlier. The dynasty embraced Chinese expansionism. By the late 19th century, in response to competition with other states, the Qing government of China attempted to exert direct control of its frontier areas by conquest or, if already under military control, conversion into provinces.

The ability of Qing China to project power into Central Asia came about because of two changes, one social and one technological. The social change was that under the Qing dynasty, from 1642, the Chinese military forces were organized around cavalry which was more suited for power projection than prior Chinese infantry. The technological change was advances in artillery which negated the military advantage that the people of the steppe had with their cavalry. The Dzungar Khanate was the last great independent nomadic power on the steppe of Central Asia. The Dzungars were deliberately exterminated in a brutal campaign during the Dzungar genocide by Manchu Bannermen and Khalkha Mongols. It has been estimated that more than a million people were slaughtered, and it took generations for it to recover. The Qing ruling family Aisin Gioro was supportive of Tibetan Buddhism and many in the ruling class adopted the religion.

The Qing dynasty was seen to be the return of Chinese expansionist policies. Under the Qing rule, China expanded beyond the Great Wall and started to annex more territories in process. The Qing invaded Korea, managed to conquer Mongolia, and also annexed modern territories of Xinjiang and Tibet as well. The Qing also managed to extend its control into Central Asia for once more, mostly concentrated in what would be today Kazakhstan, Kyrgyzstan and Tajikistan. The Qing also destroyed the Kingdom of Tungning of Koxinga, and annexed Taiwan as well. This marked for the first time, China managed to directly control Xinjiang, Taiwan, Tibet, Central Asia and Mongolia. China also marked its claims far to Sakhalin, even though the Qing didn't manage to control it; or even to Kashmir where it fought a bitter war against the Sikhs.

Ming loyalists led by Koxinga invaded Taiwan and expelled Dutch colonialists from the island during the Siege of Fort Zeelandia and founded the Chinese Kingdom of Tungning. The Ming loyalists quickly moved to replace the institutions and culture of Dutch colonial rule with Han Chinese colonial rule. Language and religious institutions left by the Dutch were closed and replaced with Confucian temples and Chinese language schools for both Han Chinese and aboriginals. Officials encouraged new immigration of Han Chinese from China into territory further inland, turning aboriginal lands into new farmland. After fighting between the Ming loyalists and the Qing during the Revolt of the Three Feudatories, the Qing attacked the Kingdom of Tungning. the Qing won the Battle of Penghu and the Ming loyalists submitted to Qing rule. Tungning was annexed as part of Fujian. The Qing were "reluctant colonizers" but became convinced of Taiwan's value to their empire due to the threat the island posed if used as a base by rival powers, and by its abundant resources. The Qing turned Taiwan into its own province in 1885, after Japanese interest and a defeated French invasion attempt.

After the British expedition to Tibet in the waning days of the Qing dynasty, the Qing responded by sending Zhao Erfeng to further integrate Tibet into China.  He succeeded in abolishing the powers of the Tibetan local leaders in Kham and appointing Chinese magistrates in their places by 1909–10. Qing forces were also sent to Ü-Tsang in 1910 to establish a direct control over Tibet proper, though a province was never established in this area.

The Qing campaign against Burma (Myanmar) (1765–1769) was its most disastrous and costly frontier war. It ended in a military defeat but the Qing rulers could not accept Burma as an equal, and when diplomatic relations were resumed in 1790, the Qing court considered it a restoration of Chinese suzerainty.

Republic of China 
When the Qing collapsed in 1912, the newly established Republic of China found itself in dire need situation to protect its newly acquired border; both Tibet and Outer Mongolia declared their independence from China, but they were not recognized by the Republic of China. Therefore, the Republic of China focused its efforts on consolidating their control over Chinese territories and refused to embrace expansionist policy. The Republic of China, however, faced numerous pressure from the expansionist Empire of Japan in 1915, with the Twenty-One Demands caused public uproars. It also faced strong opposition from the Soviet Union, which also embraced expansionist policy, leading to the border conflict of 1929. The Soviets and Japanese meddling into Chinese affairs and the lack of compromises from Western leaders over Japanese and Russian expansionism made the work difficult, as Russia had interests with regard to Xinjiang, and Japanese invasion in northeast China at 1931. On the same time, the Chinese Civil War also prevented any attempts of a possible Chinese expansion.

When World War II broke out, nonetheless Chiang Kai-shek had sought to restore Chinese influence. Being a major ally and one of the Big Four, Chiang wanted to restore Chinese influence in Korea and Southeast Asia, in a vision for a new Asia under Chiang's command. Once the World War II ended, Chiang Kai-shek started trying to implement the project, by sending troops to occupy northern Vietnam. Yet, as the Chinese Civil War resumed, it had dented Chiang's desire, and he had to retreat most of his army to fight against the now-stronger communist force. Eventually, the Republic of China lost the war and was forced to retreat to Taiwan where it continues to rule today. The expansionist policy was succeeded by the communists which later proclaimed the People's Republic of China.

People's Republic of China 
Following the de facto end of the Chinese Civil War, Chairman of the Chinese Communist Party Mao Zedong proclaimed the People's Republic of China, and, at the first stage, styled his rule after Soviet leader Joseph Stalin. China temporarily abandoned the irredentist idea to focus on internationalism promoted by the communist world. Thus, the early PRC saw China fought in the Korean War and the Vietnam War, both to help the communist North Korea and North Vietnam.

However, this didn't mean China had given up the idea of expansionism. China started to reconquer Xinjiang, absorbing the then-Second East Turkestan Republic with help from Stalin, before conquering Tibet in 1950 and crushing a later uprising.

Following Dalai Lama's escape to India, China and India fought a border war in 1962, where China gained Aksai Chin and stampeded into Arunachal Pradesh (called South Tibet in China), before retreating from the latter over increasing turmoil. Before that, China also sought to take over Taiwan, then under the authority of the rival Republic of China, causing the Second Taiwan Strait Crisis, but was unsuccessful due to American threats in response. China also sought to take over Sikkim in 1967, but it was unsuccessful. A Chinese map published in 1961 showed China claiming territories in Bhutan, Nepal and the Kingdom of Sikkim. Incursions by Chinese soldiers and Tibetan herdsmen allying with Chinese government also provoked tensions in Bhutan. Imposing a cross-border trade embargo and closing the border, Bhutan established extensive military ties with India.

In 1974, China launched its first naval expedition to reclaim the Paracel Islands and defeated the 50-strong South Vietnamese occupation force. Tensions triggered between China and later unified communist Vietnam led to the Sino-Vietnamese War of 1979. China and Vietnam later fought another bitter skirmish in the South China Sea in 1988, resulting in China's consolidation of some disputed islands.

In the opening speech at the 19th National Congress of the Chinese Communist Party (CCP), CCP General Secretary Xi Jinping emphasized the PRC's sovereignty over Taiwan, stating that "We have sufficient abilities to thwart any form of Taiwan independence attempts."

Territories claimed by the Republic of China 

During the 20th century, the Republic of China claimed that numerous neighbouring countries and regions in Asia were lost territories of China. Many of these lost territories were under the rule of Imperial Chinese dynasties or were tributary states. Sun Yat-sen claimed that these territories were lost due to unequal treaties, forceful occupation and annexation, and foreign interference. Chiang Kai-shek and Mao Zedong, among others, were supportive of these claims.

Cases of discussion
Since the Chinese economic reform of 1978, China has managed to transform into a new economic, military and political great power. As China transformed, there have been hopes that China would give up its expansionist idea. However, since the rise of Chinese Communist Party general secretary Xi Jinping in power, and increasing territorial conflicts which China stated most of their disputed lands belong to China, it is generally believed that China continues to adhere to irredentist claims.

Annexation of Tibet 

The annexation of Tibet by the People's Republic of China (called the "Peaceful Liberation of Tibet" by the Chinese government and the "Chinese invasion of Tibet" by the Tibetan Government in Exile) were the series of events from 1950 to 1959 by which the People's Republic of China (PRC) gained control of Tibet.
These regions came under the control of China after attempts by the Government of Tibet to gain international recognition, efforts to modernize its military, negotiations between the Government of Tibet and the PRC, a military conflict in the Chamdo area of western Kham in October 1950, and the eventual acceptance of the Seventeen Point Agreement by the Government of Tibet under Chinese pressure in October 1951. The Government of Tibet remained in place under the authority of China until the 1959 Tibetan uprising, when the Dalai Lama was forced to flee into exile in India and after which the Government of Tibet and Tibetan social structures were dissolved.

Five Fingers of Tibet 

Five Fingers of Tibet is the Chinese strategy originally propounded by CCP chairman Mao Zedong to annex Ladakh (disputed territory), Nepal, Sikkim (disputed territory), Bhutan, and Arunachal Pradesh (disputed territory). According to the Five Fingers of Tibet strategy, Tibet is considered as China's right hand palm, with five fingers on its periphery: Ladakh, Nepal, Sikkim, Bhutan and Arunachal Pradesh, with the ultimate objective to assert China's claim and authority over these regions.

East China Sea disputes 

With the 1978 Chinese economic reform launched by Deng Xiaoping, China has increased its political stance, its influence and its power abroad. On one side, China remains deeply neutral and not involving itself in any conflict 
, and the land borders are stable .  China has increased its influence, while using military and economic wealth and claims to island territories that have caused anxiety in neighbors to the east, such as the Philippines and Japan.

South China Sea disputes 

The South China Sea disputes involve both island and maritime claims of China and the claims of several neighboring sovereign states in the region, namely Brunei, the Republic of China (ROC/Taiwan), Indonesia, Malaysia, the Philippines, and Vietnam. The disputes are over islands, reefs, banks, and other features in the South China Sea, including the Spratly Islands, Paracel Islands, Scarborough Shoal, boundaries in the Gulf of Tonkin and the waters near the Indonesian Natuna Islands.

Belt and Road Initiative 

Jeffrey Reeves (2018) argues that since 2012, CCP general secretary Xi Jinping has demonstrated "a concerted imperialist policy" towards its developing neighbor states to the south and west, especially Mongolia, Kazakhstan, Tajikistan, Kyrgyzstan, Afghanistan, Pakistan, Nepal, Myanmar, Cambodia, Laos, and Vietnam.

See also

 Han nationalism
 Han chauvinism
 History of China
 Monarchy of China
 Chinese nationalism
 Chinese irredentism
 Emperor at home, king abroad
 Greater China
 Sinicization
 Sinocentrism
 Tributary system of China
 Territorial disputes in the South China Sea
 Nanyang (region)
 Western imperialism in Asia
 Salami slicing tactics
 String of Pearls strategy
 Five Fingers of Tibet policy

References

Further reading

 Chan, Steve. China's Troubled Waters: Maritime Disputes in Theoretical Perspective (Cambridge UP, 2016)  excerpt
 Chang, Chun-shu. The Rise of the Chinese Empire: Nation, State, and Imperialism in Early China, ca. 1600 B.C.–A.D. 8 (Volume 1,  University of Michigan Press, 2007).
 
 Hawksley, Humphrey. Asian Waters: The Struggle Over the South China Sea and the Strategy of Chinese Expansion (2018) excerpt
 Mancall, Mark. China at the Center: 300 Years of Foreign Policy (1984)
 Reeves, Jeffrey.  "Imperialism and the Middle Kingdom: the Xi Jinping administration's peripheral diplomacy with developing states." Third World Quarterly 39.5 (2018): 976–998.
 Setzekorn, Eric. "Chinese Imperialism, Ethnic Cleansing, and Military History, 1850–1877." Journal of Chinese Military History 4.1 (2015): 80–100.
 
 Toje, Asle. Will China's Rise Be Peaceful?: Security, Stability, and Legitimacy (Oxford UP, 2017). excerpt
 Westad, Odd Arne. Restless Empire: China and the World Since 1750 (2012) excerpt

Imperialism
Imperial China
Political history of China
Empires
Neocolonialism